Benjamin Njongoue Elliott (born 5 November 2002) is a professional footballer currently playing as a midfielder for Chelsea and the Cameroon national team .

Club career
Born in Kingston upon Thames, Elliott joined the academy of Chelsea at the age of eight. He suffered a serious knee injury at the age of fifteen, keeping him out for two years. Following his return to action, he signed his first professional contract in November 2019. He was linked with a move away from The Blues in November 2021, with fellow Premier League side Southampton being strongly linked.

He was included in Chelsea's under-23 side for 2022–23 pre-season, scoring a goal against American side Real Monarchs in a 2–2 friendly game. Later in the same season, he travelled with the senior squad to Abu Dhabi for a warm weather training camp during the Premier League's mid-season break for the 2022 FIFA World Cup.

International career
Elliott is eligible to represent both England and Cameroon at international level. He has represented England at under-15 and under-16 level, captaining the under-15 side.

In March 2023, Elliott was called up to the Cameroon senior squad for the first time.

Career statistics

Club

References

2002 births
Living people
People from Kingston upon Thames
Footballers from Greater London
English people of Cameroonian descent
English footballers
England youth international footballers
Cameroonian footballers
Association football midfielders
Chelsea F.C. players
Black British sportspeople